This split CD contains songs by two Polish hardcore bands: The Hunkies and Eye for an Eye

Track listing

The Hunkies tracks
Introduction
Teraz czy później (eng. Now or later)
Nadczłowiek (eng. Superhuman)
Nie wierzę z całych sił (eng. I strongly do not believe)
Twarda dyscyplina (eng. Hard discipline)
Hunkies
Jaki mam być (eng. What I'm supposed to be like)
Czy starczy sił? (eng. Will we have enough strength?)

Eye for an Eye tracks
Bramy (eng. Gates)
Manekin
Własny ląd (eng. An own land)
Hardcore (?) łączy nas (eng. Hardcore (?) is uniting us)
True till death
To (eng. It)
Wyjście z cienia (eng. Exit from the shadow)

Personnel

The Hunkies
Paweł Czekała ("Piguła") - bass guitar
Paweł Boguszewski ("Dmuchacz") - drums
"Palestyna" - guitar
Piotr Skotnicki ("Skoda") - guitar
"Nemeczek" - vocals

Eye for an Eye
Anka - vocals
Tomek - guitar
Bartek - guitar
Damian - bass guitar
Rafał - drums

Resources
Jimmy Jazz Records

2004 albums
Rock'n'roller albums
Split albums
Eye for an Eye (band) albums
The Hunkies albums